The 1989–90 season was the 88th in the history of the Western Football League.

The league champions for the second time in their history were Taunton Town. The champions of Division One were Ottery St Mary.

This season marked a return to the system of three points being awarded for a win, rather than two points. The three-point system had previously been used for five seasons between 1974 and 1979.

Final tables

Premier Division
The Premier Division remained at 21 clubs after Minehead were relegated to the First Division. One club joined:

Tiverton Town, runners-up in the First Division.

First Division
The First Division remained at 20 clubs, after Tiverton Town were promoted to the Premier Division. One new club joined:

Minehead, relegated from the Premier Division.

References

1989-90
6